"Pronto a correre" (English: Ready to run) is a song recorded by Italian singer Marco Mengoni for his album #prontoacorrere. The track, written by Mark Owen, Benjamin Mark Weaver, Jamie Norton, David James Harvey Gibson, Marco Mengoni and Ermal Meta, was produced by Michele Canova.

After being released in April 2013 as the second single from the album, it peaked at number seven on the Italian FIMI Top Digital Downloads chart and it was certified platinum for domestic downloads exceeding 30,000 units.

Background

The song was originally written in English, with the title "Put the Light On", by English singer-songwriter Mark Owen, together with Benjamin Mark Weaver, Jamie Norton and David James Harvey Gibson.
Mengoni received the original version of the song, and he wrote the Italian-language lyrics together with Ermal Meta, former leader of the indie pop band La Fame di Camilla. The English-language version of "Pronto a correre" as released by Mengoni as a bonus track included on the iTunes version of the album #prontoacorrere.

During an interview released to Italian magazine TV Sorrisi e Canzoni, Mengoni declared that, while working on the track with producer Michele Canova, he never met its original composer, Mark Owen, but he talked with him through the Internet. During the same interview, Mengoni described the meaning of "Pronto a correre", explaining that "it is not a love song, it talks about the scars left throughout life by human relationships, including those with friends or colleagues."

Music video

The music video for the song was directed by Gaetano Morbioli, and it was broadcast for the first time by Sky Uno on 26 April 2013. Filmed in April 2013 at the Stadio Marc'Antonio Bentegodi in Verona, Italy, it shows Mengoni running a relay race together with people of different ages, including a 7-year-old child, a pregnant woman and an 82-year-old woman.
According to Mengoni, the video represents the cycle of life, and it describes "the experience of a common growth, the growth of all of those people who live their lives running, as well as those who prefer not to move, or they would like to run but they can't do it. The video wants to bring a message for all of those who live and consider their worst experiences as a gift to improve themselves."

Live performances
Mengoni performed "Pronto a correre" several times. His first televised performance of the song was on 14 April 2013, during Rai 2's tv show Quelli che... il Calcio.
On 9 May 2013, he sang the song during the third live show of the first series of The Voice of Italy. Two days later, he performed it with the Sanremo Festival Orchestra during Radio Italia Live, the concert featuring several Italian artists and organized by the broadcaster Radio Italia Solo Musica Italiana in Piazza del Duomo, Milan.
Mengoni sang "Pronto a correre" during the award ceremony of the Wind Music Awards at the Foro Italico in Rome on 3 June 2013, as well as during the Italian MTV Awards, held in Florence on 15 June 2013.
The song was also included in the set list of L'essenziale tour.

Charts

Credits and personnel
Credits adapted from #prontoacorrere's liner notes.

Musicians
 David James Harvey Gibson – composer
 Larry Goldings – piano, Hammond organ, keyboards
 Raggie Hamilton – bass
 Michael Landau – guitars
 Marco Mengoni – composer, vocals
 Ermal Meta – composer
 Jamie Norton – composer
 Gary Novak – drums
 Mark Owen – composer
 Luca Scarpa – piano, Hammond organ, keyboards
 Davide Tagliapietra – guitars
 Benjamin Mark Weaver – composer

Production
 Antonio Baglio – mastering
 Michele Canova – producer, mixing, engineer
 Csaba Petocz – engineer
 Davide Tagliapietra – engineer

References

2013 singles
Marco Mengoni songs
Songs written by Mark Owen
Songs written by Jamie Norton
Songs written by Marco Mengoni
2013 songs
Sony Music singles
Song recordings produced by Michele Canova
Songs written by Dave Gibson (Scottish singer-songwriter)